Footsteps in the Fog is a 1955 British Technicolor film noir crime film starring Stewart Granger and Jean Simmons, with a screenplay co-written by Lenore Coffee and Dorothy Davenport, and released by Columbia Pictures. The film is based on the short story "The Interruption" by W. W. Jacobs.

It was shot at Shepperton Studios, with sets designed by the art director Wilfred Shingleton.

Plot
After poisoning and killing his wife, the master of the house, Stephen Lowry (Granger), is blackmailed by his Cockney maid, Lily Watkins (Jean Simmons), who demands promotion. As she steadily takes the place of his dead wife, Lowry attempts to murder her as well. While attempting to murder Lily, by following someone who looked like her through the fog, he mistakenly kills Constable Burke's wife and gets chased by an angry mob, which he evades. Lily returns home and Stephen learns of his mistake. Some local bar-goers saw him murder Mrs Burke and Stephen is put on trial, but their claims are dismissed after  they are revealed to drink a lot and Lily lies to provide an alibi. The main testimony however is Lily's - who swears he never left the house - she does this as she wants to marry him.

Although Lowry owes Lily his life, his eyes are on another woman - Elizabeth Travers - the daughter of a wealthy man - and object of affection of his lawyer. He tells Lily it is part of a plot to gain money and he will use the money to take Lily and himself to America. He suggests he will marry her but demands she retrieves a letter she sent to her sister telling of Lowry's actions. But Herbert, her sister's husband rescues the letter from the fire. He goes to Lowry's lawyer and tries to extort £500 for the incriminating letter.

Lowry feigns illness and sends the maid to fetch the doctor. She says she will return urgently with the doctor within five minutes. He calculates this will be enough time for him to frame the maid by drinking the poison that he used to kill his own wife and planting it and his wife's jewelry in the maid's room.

Lily is, however, detained by the police as a "tell-all" letter she has written to her sister, to safeguard herself after the master's failed plot to kill her, surfaces.

Lowry's plan backfires - he is dying. He gets Burke the local policeman to run for the doctor. Meanwhile Lily's handwriting is compared to the letter. Lily is told it doesn't match - but it does. A warrant is sworn for the arrest of Lowry. Lily returns too late, and the doctor declares it is too late to save him. Lily pieces together the situation, realising that Stephen never loved her, then is arrested by police at the scene as Lowry accuses her of poisoning both him and his wife.

Cast
 Stewart Granger as Stephen Lowry
 Jean Simmons as Lily Watkins
 Bill Travers as David MacDonald, Lowry's lawyer
 Belinda Lee as Elizabeth Travers
 Ronald Squire as Alfred Travers
 Finlay Currie as Inspector Peters
 William Hartnell as Herbert Moresby
 Frederick Leister as Dr. Simpson
 Percy Marmont as Magistrate
 Marjorie Rhodes as Mrs. Park
 Peter Bull as Brasher
 Barry Keegan as Constable Burke
 Sheila Manahan as Rose Moresby
 Norman Macowan as Grimes
 Cameron Hall as Corcoran
 Victor Maddern as Jones
 Arthur Howard as Vicar
 Peter Williams as Constable Farrow
 Erik Chitty as Hedges

Production

Development
The film was based on a story "The Interruption", first published in the July 4, 1925, issue of Liberty magazine and later collected in Sea Whispers in 1926. Arthur Lubin bought the rights to the story in August 1949 for his own company. Several parties were interested in the story. The rights holders liked the job Lubin did on Two Sinners based on the story of a friend of theirs, Warwick Deeping. Lubin hoped to make the film in October 1949 from a script by Dorothy Reid with Glenn Ford starring.

However Lubin instead made Francis the Talking Mule and became busy doing comedies with animals. He continued to seek finance for The Interruption saying he wanted to "remind producers that he can direct people too." In August 1951 he said he said signed Leonard Styles to play the barrister and wanted to make the movie after It Grows on Trees. In April 1952 Lubin said Dorothy Reid was writing a script and that he hoped to star Jean Simmons or Jennifer Jones in the female lead and Robert Donat in the male lead.

In July 1952 Lubin said he was about to sign a deal with James Woolf of Romulus Films. He visited England in August seeking to raise finance and hoped for Terence Rattigan to write the script.
 
In October 1953 Lubin, who had just made Star of India in England, said he planned to shoot it in that country as The Interrupted with Glynis Johns starring. In March 1954 the film was called Deadlock and Lubin had sent a script to Alec Guinness. Then in June 1954 Lubin said Columbia had agreed to finance and that Maureen O'Hara and George Sanders would star.

Then in October Lubin announced the stars would be Stewart Granger and Jean Simmons and the film would be made by Mike Frankovich's company, Film Locations. Later the title would be changed to Rebound before Footsteps in the Fog.

The film was to be the second in a four picture slate from Frankovich's Film Locations. The first was Fire Over Africa. The third was to be Ghosts of Drury Lane directed by Lubin. The fourth was to be Matador starring and directed by JoséFerrer. The third and fourth films were not made.

Shooting
Arthur Lubin enjoyed making the film. "Mike [Frankovich] was a very nice person to work for", he recalled. "I had problems with the leading man, Stewart Granger, who hated me. He didn't like anything. He would go to Frankovich and say 'Mike, if Lubin doesn't stop annoying me I'm going to be sick tomorrow.' But miraculously the picture turned out to be a good one."

Reception
According to Kinematograph Weekly it was a "money maker" at the British box office in 1955.

Gene Blottner said the movie is a "good Gothic noir" with both Simmons and Grainger "believably playing vile characters."

Lubin wanted to follow it with another film for Frankovich, Ghosts of Drury Lane. However it was not made.

Variety called it "humdrum, rarely exciting."

Diabolique magazine called it "an unpretentious, enjoyable little thriller... it doesn’t hit great expressionistic heights but is lots of fun, and it's a shame box office receptions weren’t strong enough to allow him do more work in this line."

References

External links

 
Footsteps in the Fog at BFI
Foosteps in the Fog at Letterbox DVD
Complete text of novel at Fullreads

1955 films
British crime thriller films
Columbia Pictures films
1955 crime drama films
Films based on works by W. W. Jacobs
Films directed by Arthur Lubin
Films set in the 1900s
British crime drama films
Films based on short fiction
Films scored by Benjamin Frankel
Films set in London
British historical films
1950s historical films
1950s English-language films
Films shot at Shepperton Studios
1950s British films